Sheila A. Skeaff (born 1961) is a Canadian-born New Zealand nutritionist and full professor at the University of Otago. Her research focusses on food literacy, sustainable diets and iodine deficiency.

Academic career 
Skeaff was born in 1961 and grew up in northern Ontario and graduated with an MSc in nutritional biochemistry from the University of Guelph in Canada in 1988. She and her husband Murray Skeaff moved to Dunedin to work at the University of Otago in mid-1989. She completed a PhD in human nutrition in 2004. 

In March 2018 Skeaff received a teaching excellence award from the University of Otago.

Selected works

References

External links 

 
 
 

Living people
1961 births
New Zealand women academics
New Zealand women scientists
Scientists from Ontario
Women nutritionists
University of Guelph alumni
Canadian emigrants to New Zealand
Academic staff of the University of Otago